ZZY or zzy may refer to:

Zhao Ziyang (1919 – 2005), Chinese politician
The romanization of the Yi Syllable "ꋩ"